Lacky Ó Máille (fl. 18th century) was an Irish friar and poet.

Ó Máille, called "the troubled friar" by Brien O'Rourke, was a native of Partry, County Mayo. He was expelled from a seminary "for rakish behaviour" by his cousin, an Athair Maolmhuire Ó Máille. This event inspired the first of two songs of his, both titled Leaici an Chuil Bhain.

He married a Widow Badger who ran an inn near Partry, but she was troubled by the unseemingly attention he paid to other women. Few of his poems and songs have survived.

References

 County Mayo in Gaelic Folksong, Brian O'Rourke, pp. 162–63, in Mayo:Aspects of its Heritage, edited by Bernard O'Hara, 1982.

People from County Mayo
Irish-language poets
Year of death unknown
18th-century Irish people
Year of birth unknown
Irish poets